Fabian Lustenberger (born 2 May 1988) is a Swiss professional footballer who plays as a defender for and captains BSC Young Boys. He has earned three caps with the Switzerland national team.

Career

FC Luzern
In his first season for FC Luzern, Lustenberger succeeded in integrating himself into the team. He earned increasingly more respect from manager Ciriaco Sforza, and by the winter break, he had earned a spot in Luzern's starting eleven.

Hertha BSC
In August 2007, Lustenberger transferred to Hertha BSC in the Bundesliga for 1.5 million Euros. In his first season with Hertha, he made 24 Bundesliga appearances. He scored his first Bundesliga goal during a Hertha 2–1 loss to 1. FC Nürnberg in December 2007. Although he was never a consistent starter, Lustenberger earned 37 caps over the two seasons that followed, and stayed with Hertha when the club was relegated to the 2. Bundesliga at the end of the 2009–10 season. During the 2010 summer break, he sustained an injury that ruled him out for almost four months. In his first game back, Lustenberger was forced to play the last eight minutes as goalkeeper, following the expulsion of Marco Sejna. Since 2013, Lustenberger has been the captain of the Berlin side, after helping Hertha BSC return to the Bundesliga after a season in 2. Bundesliga. On 9 March 2016, he extended his contract until 2019.
In 2019, after 12 years in Berlin, Lustenberger confirmed that he would not extend his contract and would leave Hertha and move back to Switzerland joining Young Boys Bern on a free.
Lustenberger played his final game for Hertha in a 5–1 home defeat to Bayer Leverkusen, spending his final 20 minutes on the pitch as captain after Vedad Ibisevic was subbed off.
He ended his career in Berlin with 308 appearances for the club.

Young Boys
On 28 January 2019, BSC Young Boys announced that Lustenberger would join the club from the upcoming 2019/20 season. He penned a three-year deal.

Personal life
His brother Simon is also a footballer who plays for the FC Luzern reserves. He is not related to his former Luzern teammate Claudio Lustenberger.

Career statistics

Club

International

Honours 

Hertha BSC
 2. Bundesliga: 2010–11, 2012–13

Young Boys
 Swiss Super League:  2019–20
 Swiss Cup: 2019–20

References

External links
 Fabian Lustenberger at HerthaBSC.de 
 

1988 births
Living people
People from Willisau District
Swiss-German people
Swiss men's footballers
Switzerland international footballers
Switzerland under-21 international footballers
Association football midfielders
Swiss Super League players
Swiss Challenge League players
Bundesliga players
2. Bundesliga players
FC Luzern players
Hertha BSC players
BSC Young Boys players
Expatriate footballers in Germany
Swiss expatriate sportspeople in Germany
Outfield association footballers who played in goal
Sportspeople from the canton of Lucerne